"One Nite Stand (Of Wolves and Sheep)" is a song by German singer–songwriter Sarah Connor featuring Haitian rapper Wyclef Jean. Written by Jean, Jerry Duplessis, O.G. Fortuna, and Connor, the song was released in German-speaking Europe on 2 September 2002 as the lead single from Connor's second studio album, Unbelievable (2002).

Connor debuted the song at the Popkomm 2002. It charted at number five on the German Singles Chart and reached the top 20 in Austria and Switzerland. "One Nite Stand (Of Wolves and Sheep)" was also planned for a UK release on 30 September 2002; however, the plans were eventually scrapped.

Track listings
European CD single
 "One Nite Stand (Of Wolves and Sheep)" (Radio Version) – 3:32
 "One Nite Stand (Of Wolves and Sheep)" (Video Version) – 3:58

European CD maxi single
 "One Nite Stand (Of Wolves and Sheep)" (Radio Version) – 3:32
 "One Nite Stand (Of Wolves and Sheep)" (Video Version) – 3:58
 "One Nite Stand (Of Wolves and Sheep)" (Buddha Groove Mix) – 4:05
 "1 + 1 = 2" – 5:01

German 12-inch single
 "One Nite Stand (Of Wolves and Sheep)" (Club Version w/ Shea's Club Keys)
 "One Nite Stand (Of Wolves and Sheep)" (Radio Version)
 "One Nite Stand (Of Wolves and Sheep)" (A Capella Version)

Charts

Weekly charts

Year-end charts

References

2002 singles
2002 songs
Sarah Connor (singer) songs
Song recordings produced by Jerry Duplessis
Songs written by Jerry Duplessis
Songs written by Sarah Connor (singer)
Songs written by Wyclef Jean
Wyclef Jean songs
X-Cell Records singles